Frederick M. Gallagher III (born November 15, 1968) is an American illustrator and web cartoonist. He is best known as the artist, co-creator, and now full owner of Megatokyo. He also goes by the name of Piro, the main character of Megatokyo, who he has stated is an idealized version of himself when he was in college. He took this name from that of the cat in the visual novel Kanon.
 
Gallagher lives with his wife and their son in Ann Arbor, Michigan.

Projects

The Fine Red Cat
The Fine Red Cat (1993) is a children's book by Jennifer Ann Gallagher, Fred Gallagher's sister. It is notable as the first published work Gallagher illustrated.

Megatokyo

The webcomic Megatokyo started its run on August 14, 2000 in collaboration with Rodney Caston, who owned the domain and wrote many of the scripts for the first year and a half, while Gallagher was responsible for the artwork. Due to creative differences, Caston agreed to sell his share in the venture to Gallagher in May 2002.

Megatokyo's success has allowed Gallagher to pursue it as a full-time occupation since October 2002, after being laid off from his job as an architect. Megatokyo in its entirety is available free of charge at the Megatokyo website, with strips being paired with comments from Gallagher. Gallagher's income from the strip comes from advertising, sales of Megatokyo books and merchandise sold through the Megagear store website which he owns.

Since Gallagher attained full control over the strip, it has become more reflective of his vision, with an increasingly complex cast of characters, and a far slower pace than the original strips. The influence of Japanese manga and computer dating sims can be seen in both the character design, plotline and storytelling. While this has earned praise from some critics, it has also alienated some fans of the earlier strips, which were more comical, relying more on humor, slapstick, gags, and simpler storylines.

Fredart
Fredart is a collection of Gallagher's works dating back several years. It includes development sketches from other projects, such as Warmth. Since Megatokyo began, most of the content has been focused on characters from that project.

Fredart Studios LLC is the name of the company that officially owns the trademark to Megatokyo and Fred's other works. Megagear Inc. is the company owned and operated by Fred and his wife Sarah that runs the MegaGear store which sells Megatokyo related merchandise.

envelop(e)
A doujinshi work of Gallagher's from 1999. As he describes it:

Using the format of an illustrated story, 'envelop(e)' tells the story of how a misplaced envelope and love letter causes confusion between childhood friends who never really understood how much they meant to each other before.

Warmth
Warmth is a more serious love story on which Gallagher was working before Megatokyo, but it was pushed into the background when Megatokyo became popular. A few chapters of Warmth were released in the early issues of I.C. Entertainment's AmeriManga magazine. Gallagher has stated a number of times that he has not given up on the property, and will continue it in the future. Gallagher had released a sample (but this was later deleted), and many other drawings that include characters who will be featured in Warmth.

The main characters of Warmth are called Tom Moore, Tobari Saeko, and Shizuhara Eimi. Both Saeko and Eimi have cameos in recent Megatokyo strips.

Blurred

Blurred was a semi-erotic experimental art website, created by Gallagher in 1998 using the pen name "blurri." Gallagher later took it offline for personal reasons, but a discussion on February 2, 2006 on 4chan started a coordinated attempt to discover the contents of this website. On June 8, 2006, Gallagher again allowed public access to the "blurred" site, and mentioned it in his newspost on Megatokyo, in order to end the controversy.

Title TBA
Fred Gallagher announced that, some time in 2007, megagear (the Megatokyo store) would release a mini doujinshi. Little to nothing was known about this project, but it was expected later in the year.
"We are looking forward to a great 2007. Megatokyo Volume 5 will be released in the Spring and we have lots of other new items planned including a skateboard deck, the first Megatokyo calendar, clocks, and a mini doujinshi for later in the year. "

It is possible that this is an endgames doujinshi.
"But maybe 2 regularly delivered comics with everything else you expect from these websites - rants, updates, etc - including some other projects like maybe 'warmth' getting off the ground (and that endgames doujin i want to do)... we'll see."

In 2009, he posted an endgames preview and called it a doujin.

In May 2011, it was announced that Endgames were being revamped in a light novel format, with a story written by webfiction author Thomas Knapp, with four light novels planned.  A short story "Behind the Masque" was also announced, and released on Amazon's Kindle Store on June 10, 2011.

Achievements
One of the most popular artists at United States anime conventions, Fred Gallagher has appeared at Otakon in 2001, 2002, 2003, and 2005, and also has appeared frequently at A-Kon, Sakura-Con, and Comic-Con International. Anime Central was the first anime convention where he sat for a panel discussion. He is also credited with being the first American manga artist to be a guest at Anime Expo Tokyo.

At conventions, Fred Gallagher hosts a panel based on the "Naze Nani Megatokyo" ("The Hows and Whys of Megatokyo") omake comic strips, an idea borrowed from an anime series, Martian Successor Nadesico. The panel contained Gallagher ("Piro") and Rodney Caston ("Largo") (before Caston left the project due to creative differences), and was also known to contain Dominic Nguyen ("Dom"). Gallagher has also attended anime conventions outside of the United States. He was Guest of Honour at Ayacon, an anime con located in Northampton, UK, at the start of November 2003. He was slated to appear at the 2006 German convention Connichi in Kassel. However, due to errors in registering his wife's ticket, this was canceled.

See also
Rodney Caston

Notes

External links

Megatokyo, Gallagher's webcomic
fredarting at Twitch
Fredrin at Pixiv

Gallagher profiled at Anime Convention Personality of the Week (March 9, 2003)

American comic strip cartoonists
Megatokyo
American webcomic creators
Artists from Ann Arbor, Michigan
Living people
1968 births